Between 1905 and 1945, the Japanese Empire administered the southern half of Sakhalin, using the name . It is commonly referred to as Karafuto Prefecture in English. The prefecture was divided into 4 , which in turn were subdivided into 11 districts, in turn divided into 41 municipalities (1 city, 13 towns, and 27 villages)

List of municipalities of Karafuto Prefecture

Prefectural capital: Toyohara

Notes
The data is as of 1945.
Some municipalities had multiple possible readings. , for instance, was read Shikuka, Shisuka, or Shikika, depending on sources.
All Kanji  names are in Shinjitai, a modern form which was not used when the prefecture existed. The Kyūjitai names used when the prefecture existed are listed in parenthesis.
The list shows the current Russian names in parenthesis. However, Russian divisions do not match with Japanese divisions. These names just roughly overlap with central towns.

Toyohara Subprefecture 
Subprefectural capital: Toyohara
Ōtomari District, alternatively Ōdomari 
Chitose Village  (Tret'ya Pad)
Fukami Village  (Prigorodnoye)
Nagahama Village  (Ozyorskoye)
Ōtomari Town, alternatively Ōdomari  (Korsakov)
Shiretoko Village  (Novikovo)
Tōbuchi Village  (Murav'yovo)
Tomuna Village  (Okhotskoye)
Rūtaka District, alternatively Rutaka 
Notoro Village  (Kirillovo)
Rūtaka Town, alternatively Rutaka  (Aniva)
Sango Village  (Taranay)
Toyohara City  (Yuzhno-Sakhalinsk)
Toyosakae District  (Vysokoye)
Kawakami Village  (Sinegorsk)
Ochiai Town  (Dolinsk)
Sakaehama Village  (Starodubskoye)
Shiranui Village  (Vzmorye)
Toyokita Village  (Lugovoye)

Maoka Subprefecture 
Subprefectural capital: Maoka
Honto District 
Honto Town  (Nevelsk)
Kaiba Village  (Moneron Island)
Kōni Village  (Shebunino)
Naihoro Town  (Gornozavodsk)
Maoka District 
Hirochi Village  (Pravda)
Konotoro Village  (Kostromskoye)
Maoka Town  (Kholmsk)
Noda Town  (Chekhovo)
Randomari Village  (Yablochny)
Shimizu Village  (Chaplakovo)
Tomarioru District 
Kushunnai Village  (Ilyinskoye)
Nayori Village  (Penzenskoye)
Tomarioru Town  (Tomari)

Esutoru Subprefecture 
Subprefectural capital: Esutoru
Esutoru District 
Chinnai Town  (Krasnogorsk)
Esutoru Town  (Uglegorsk)
Tōro Town  (Shakhtyorsk)
Ushiro Village  (Orlovo)
Nayoshi District 
Nayoshi Town  (Lesogorskoye)
Nishisakutan Village  (Boshnyakovo)

Shikuka Subprefecture 
Subprefectural capital: Shikuka
Motodomari District, alternatively Mototomari 
Hoyori Village  (Pugachevo)
Motodomari Village, alternatively Mototomari 
Shirutoru Town, alternatively Shiritori  (Makarov)
Shikuka District, alternatively Shisuka or Shikika 
Chirie Village  (Kotikovo)
Nairo Village  (Gastello)
Shikuka Town, alternatively Shisuka or Shikika  (Poronaysk)
Tomarikishi Village  (Vakhrushev)

See also
Administrative divisions of Sakhalin Oblast

External links
  (Table of the transitions of municipalities of Karafuto)

Karafuto

ru:Карафуто#Административное деление